The 20/20 Experience is the third studio album by American singer-songwriter Justin Timberlake. It was released on March 15, 2013, by RCA Records, as the follow-up to his second studio album FutureSex/LoveSounds (2006). It is considered the first half of a two-piece project, later being supplemented by his fourth studio album The 20/20 Experience – 2 of 2 (2013). The album incorporates neo soul styles with elements of older soul music; its lyrics discuss themes of romance and sex. Production is handled by Timbaland, Timberlake, who also serves as the album's executive producer, and Jerome "J-Roc" Harmon, with Rob Knox contributing to the album's deluxe edition.

The 20/20 Experience received generally positive reviews from critics, many of whom praised its organic sound and hailed it as a significant pop release. The album debuted at number one on the US Billboard 200 with first-week sales of 968,000 copies – the biggest sales week of the year, becoming Timberlake's second number one album on the chart and best-selling debut week of his solo career. The 20/20 Experience became the best-selling album of 2013 in the US, making it the Billboard Year-End number-one album. The album also became Timberlake's third consecutive number-one album in the United Kingdom, topped the charts in various other countries and set a digital sales record for being the fastest-selling album on the iTunes Store. As of July 2014, sales of The 20/20 Experience stands at six million copies globally.

Three singles have been released from The 20/20 Experience. Its lead single, "Suit & Tie", peaked within the top five in several countries worldwide, and reached number three in the US. The album's second single, "Mirrors", reached number one in the UK and two in the US. Timberlake embarked on the Legends of the Summer Stadium Tour with Jay-Z to further promote the album, as well as The 20/20 Experience World Tour. The album, as part of the compilation The 20/20 Experience – The Complete Experience, was nominated for a Grammy Award in the category Best Pop Vocal Album. "Suit and Tie" and "Pusher Love Girl" won for Best Music Video and Best R&B Song, respectively.

Development and title 
 In September 2006, Timberlake released his second studio album FutureSex/LoveSounds. Critically and commercially acclaimed, the album spawned six singles, including the worldwide hits "SexyBack", "My Love" and "What Goes Around... Comes Around". After wrapping up a worldwide concert tour in support of the album in 2007, Timberlake took a break from his music career to focus on acting. In 2010, Timberlake's manager, Johnny Wright, began conversations with the singer about working on new music. The two had general decisions about ways to release new music, because according to Wright, "a lot of the physical record sellers were gone, by the time we've got music again we need to think about different ways to deliver it". Wright proposed a promotion based on an application or releasing a new song every month. Timberlake, however, was not interested in going back into music and instead continued to focus on his film career. Around the "late part of May/first week in June" 2012, Timberlake asked Wright to dinner and revealed to him that he had spent the last couple of nights in studio with Timbaland working on new material. Wright was shocked at the revelation, telling Billboard magazine that he "wasn't prepared for that." The two immediately began marketing plans for how the album should be promoted and when it should be released. Ultimately, they agreed "to do this in a shorter period of time, so let's put the single out and [release the album] seven or eight weeks after that – make it a short window, and because we have such a short window, we have to make a big impact."

Subsequently, in August 2012, producer Jim Beanz reported that Timberlake started working on his new music project. However, at that time, shortly after the announcement, Timberlake's publicist revealed that there were no current plans for a new Timberlake album, affirming instead that Timberlake was working with Timbaland on songs for his upcoming project Shock Value III. After the release of The 20/20 Experience, Wright confirmed that the album was finished in the middle of July and described it as a "fast record". Timberlake had four weeks to record the whole material, because he had to shoot his scenes for the film Runner Runner. Although, originally planned for release in October 2012, the album's date was postponed because of the singer's wedding with actress Jessica Biel. Wright stated that although in the project were involved artists who are also primarily Timberlake's friends it was tough keeping the album a secret, making them use codenames for the project. During an interview with American radio and television host Ryan Seacrest, Timberlake explained the meaning behind the album's title saying, "It more or less came out of: I was playing some of the stuff for my friends and they would come in and out of the studio and I'd say, 'What do you think of this?' And my best friend said, 'This is music that you can see,' and for some reason that stuck with me."

Recording 
 
The 20/20 Experience was produced in a span of 20 days. Recording sessions for The 20/20 Experience began in the "late part of May, first week in June" and concluded in July 2012. The album was recorded at Larrabee Studios in North Hollywood, EastWest Studios in Los Angeles, and Jungle City Studios in New York City. Of Timbaland's participation, Wright said: "(Their) relationship is like a brotherhood; they're just so comfortable with each other – not only as musical friends but as personal friends... that you can get things done in a short period of time. Had (the Affleck movie) not happened, we might have actually set up and put the album out sooner."

After recording was finished, Timberlake and Wright, with M2M Construction, begin "formulating plans for how to release the music". Justin Timberlake, and most of the band used JH Audio in-ear monitoring systems. With regards to the album's lead single "Suit & Tie", Timberlake shared with 97.1 AMP Radio/Los Angeles how the classic, "Get out your seat, Hov" lyric was born inside the studio with JAY-Z: "I had finished the verses and I was going in to record them and he was sitting in the room working, freestyling to himself. And then he came up with a line he really liked and he jumped out of his seat and he said, 'Uh oh! Get out of that seat, Hov.' And I just thought it was so funny. It made me laugh. I was standing right beside him when he did it and so I just put it on the record, more or less as a joke to him." Timberlake added that the song harkens back to the glory years of the Rat Pack. "Not to compare ourselves to those guys, but just the fun that they had," he said. "I was picturing like, being at the Sands in Vegas and saying, 'Oh, JAY-Z's in the house tonight. Uh, let's have him come up and do a number. Why don't you go ahead and get out of your seat, Hov?' That's more or less where it came from."

Music and lyrics 
According to Timberlake, the album "goes a lot of different directions. I think there's probably a little bit of what was reminiscent on the first album and then a little bit of what's reminiscent of the second album, and then some new stuff." While working on the album, Timberlake thought: "If Pink Floyd and Led Zeppelin can do 10-minute songs and Queen can do 10-minute songs then why can't we? We'll figure out the radio edits later."

The 20/20 Experience is a neo soul album partly inspired by the expansive song structures of 1960s and 1970s rock. The songs have average lengths of seven minutes and are characterized by vamps, abrupt key changes, and unexpected rhythms and harmonies. Music journalist Jody Rosen observed an emphasis on "rhythm and flow" rather than catchiness, and said that it is "not quite a pop album", as its "sense of musical space-time is more elastic and sprawling than anything on the radio". The album's music incorporates samples of piano, distorted voices, and buzzing electronic sounds with elements of older soul music, including resonant voiceovers, lush string and horn arrangements, high-pitched guitar solos, and squelching analog synthesizers. Steven Hyden said that the album has "traditionalist tendencies", and Simon Price wrote that producers Timbaland and J-Roc merged 1970s influences with futuristic sounds: "the Chi-Lites in orbit, the Isley Brothers gone intergalactic, and so on." Price also compared their production on the album to Quincy Jones's production on Michael Jackson's 1979 album Off the Wall.

The album's lyrics mostly deal with the theme of romance. The songs feature different metaphors for love, including drugs on "Pusher Love Girl", candy on "Strawberry Bubblegum", and outer space on "Spaceship Coupe". Music critic Ken Tucker wrote that each song portrays Timberlake as a "starry-eyed romantic, bedazzled by a woman upon whom he cannot heap enough compliments, come-ons and seductive playfulness."

Singles 

"Suit & Tie", featuring rapper Jay-Z, was released as the album's lead single on January 14, 2013. It is a mid-tempo R&B song that "floats along" like a song from the American band The Whispers. The music video for "Suit & Tie" was shot on January 25, 2013, and released on February 14, 2013. It was directed by David Fincher, who previously directed The Social Network (2010), a film in which Timberlake starred. Commercially, it was a success and managed to reach top 10 positions in 15 countries. It reached number three on the UK Singles Chart and number three on the US Billboard Hot 100.

"Mirrors" was released as the second single from the album on February 11, 2013, following his performance at the 2013 Grammy Awards. The single topped in the UK and reached the top five in Denmark, Ireland, Germany, South Korea and Switzerland. It peaked at number two on the US Billboard Hot 100. Internationally, the song reached the top-10 in 23 countries, making it more successful in terms of chart placings than the previous single "Suit & Tie".

"Tunnel Vision" was released as the third and final single from the album on June 14, 2013. The music video was released on July 3, 2013.

Promotion 
 
Timberlake and Wright met with RCA Records heads Peter Edge and Tom Corson in September 2012, to "plot release strategies for the album". Wright and RCA Records began discussions with Target and other corporations for marketing plans for the album in November. Timberlake, part-owner of the social media site Myspace, put "Suit & Tie"  on the splash page with a chance to stream or download the song simply for joining or signing in during the site's reboot in January 2013. Timberlake and Jay-Z then performed "Suit & Tie" at the 55th Annual Grammy Awards on February 10, 2013. They performed the song again during Timberlake's hosting of Saturday Night Live on March 9, 2013. Timberlake debuted the live performance of the second single "Mirrors" at the Brit Awards 2013 ceremony at the O2 Arena in London on February 20, 2013. He sang two songs from the album, "Pusher Love Girl" and "That Girl", during the Super Bowl XLVII weekend.

Timberlake performed a preview concert at the Roseland Ballroom on May 5, 2013. He held a one-off concert in Dublin, Ireland at Phoenix Park on July 10, 2013. On February 22, 2013, it was announced that Timberlake and Jay-Z would embark on the Legends of the Summer Stadium Tour, a co-headlining series of concerts. He headlined the 2013 Yahoo Wireless Festival at Queen Elizabeth Olympic Park for two of the three nights of the festival. The first was July 12, where he headlined alone. The second was July 14, where he headlined with Jay-Z. It served as a preview for the Legends of the Summer tour, which kicked off July 17, in Toronto, Ontario, Canada.

To promote the album further, Timberlake announced on May 5, 2013, that he would embark on The 20/20 Experience World Tour, his second concert tour on a global scale. Promoted primarily by AEG Live, the tour would debut on October 31, 2013, in Montreal, just two months after the Legends of the Summer tour concluded. Twenty-two additional dates were also announced across Canada and the United States, ending on February 10, 2014, in Omaha, Nebraska. Several dates were made available for pre-sale for members of The Tennessee Kids, Timberlake's official fan club. Timberlake's official website noted that, while unannounced, additional dates in Europe, South America and Australia would follow. Timberlake headlined the iTunes Festival in September 2013.

Critical reception 

The 20/20 Experience received generally positive reviews from critics. At Metacritic, which assigns a normalized rating out of 100 to reviews from mainstream publications, the album received an average score of 75, based on 39 reviews. Sputnikmusic's Sobhi Youssef called it "expertly" written and produced, and cited it as a "profound manifestation" of recent innovations in R&B. Mikael Wood of the Los Angeles Times found its elaborate structures ambitious in the vein of Stevie Wonder, Prince, and Michael Jackson. Andy Gill of The Independent called it "diversely enjoyable" and viewed Timbaland's production as solid, albeit not innovative. Jody Rosen, writing for Rolling Stone, said that, although it lacks songs as immediate as Timberlake's previous hits, the album's multidimensional music eventually "sinks its teeth in, even on the wooziest songs." Jordan Sargent of Spin called it a "sonic wonder" and said that the songs are ingenious enough to justify their lengths.

Pitchforks Ryan Dombal commended Timberlake for "shamelessly extol[ing] the joys of music and marriage", and viewed the album as more ambitious than his 2002 debut album Justified and more consistent than FutureSex/LoveSounds. Kitty Empire, writing for The Observer, found it mostly "terrific – lush and quirky too", with silly, respectable homages to Prince. Helen Brown of The Daily Telegraph said that the music feels both grandiose and intimate, and that Timberlake makes up for his thin voice with "yearning charisma and sly timing to sell every swoon." Genevieve Koski of The A.V. Club called the album "an exercise in sophisticated sexiness" and complimented Timberlake's "preternatural assuredness", viewing that his "skilled" performance rectifies the calculated production.

However, some reviewers criticized the album's lyrics. Alexis Petridis of The Guardian felt that the album's adventurous music is marred by Timberlake's lyrics, which he called "porny" and "awful". George Morahan of State called them banal and dismissed most of the music as "a protracted exploration of rhythm" that Timberlake and Timbaland are too familiar with. Slant Magazines Eric Henderson wrote that they overembellished "rehashed" musical ideas, "turning each B+ potential single into a C− epic." AllMusic's Andy Kellman said that "few songs are dynamic enough to justify their length" on a refined, but bloated album. Jon Caramanica of The New York Times panned it as an "amiable, anodyne album" with little variation and seven-minute songs that masquerade as "artistry". Siân Rowe of NME viewed that Frank Ocean and Miguel are "doing better R&B jams in under four minutes."

Accolades
The 20/20 Experience was ranked at number 11 on Billboards "15 Best Albums of 2013: Critics' Picks" list. Sputnikmusic staff ranked the album at number two on their year-end list. Drowned in Sound featured the album at 17 on their list of favorite albums of the year. For their "The 20 Best Albums of the 2010s (So Far)" published in January 2015, Billboard listed the album at number 14, commenting "Timberlake came back as a lovesick adult, bouncing old-school soul ideas off of his best bud Timbaland and writing a modern-day symphony for his beloved, Jessica Biel, that stretched for over an hour. We all grow up, but few do so as stylishly as JT."

Awards
The album, as part of the compilation The 20/20 Experience – The Complete Experience, was nominated for a Grammy Award in the category Best Pop Vocal Album. Additionally, "Mirrors" was nominated for Best Pop Solo Performance, "Suit & Tie" for Best Pop Duo/Group Performance and Best Music Video, and "Pusher Love Girl" for Best R&B Song, winning the latter two. The 20/20 Experience won Favorite Soul/R&B Album at the 2013 American Music Awards, Top Billboard 200 Album and Top R&B Album at the 2014 Billboard Music Awards, and Favorite Album at the 40th People's Choice Awards. Timberlake won four awards at the 2013 MTV Video Music Awards, including Video of the Year for "Mirrors".

It also received nominations for Favorite Pop/Rock Album at the American Music Awards, Album of the Year at the 2013 Soul Train Music Awards, Outstanding Album at the 2014 NAACP Image Award, and World's Best Album at the World Music Awards.

Commercial performance 
In the United States, The 20/20 Experience debuted at number one on the US Billboard 200 and sold 968,000 copies in its first week, becoming Timberlake's second number-one album as a solo artist. Sales figures for the first week are the highest of Timberlake's career, surpassing his previous studio efforts Justified and FutureSex/LoveSounds, which sold 439,000 and 684,000 copies in their debut weeks respectively. In its second chart week, the album sold 318,000 copies in the US, remaining in the top position and becoming the first album of the year to sell one million units. The album remained at number one for a third week selling 139,000 units. In its fourth week, with sales of 98,000 units, the album was pushed to number two by Paramore's self-titled album, which sold 106,000 copies. The album was certified double platinum in April 2013, having shipped more than two million copies in just under a month after its release. It became the best selling album of 2013 in the US with 2,427,000 copies sold for the year. As of 2018, the album has accumulated 3.8 million album-equivalent units in the US, combining sales and equivalent streams. As of July 2014, joint sales of The 20/20 Experience with 2 of 2 stands at six million copies globally.

The 20/20 Experience had the biggest sales week of 2013. The album's first week sales are the 19th-largest week for an album since SoundScan started tracking data in 1991. Among male artists, Timberlake has the largest week in nearly five years. The last larger sales week by a man was when Lil Wayne's Tha Carter III debuted with 1.01 million on June 28, 2008. The 20/20 Experience also tallies the third-biggest week for a solo male singer.

Overseas, the album saw similar success. In the UK, The 20/20 Experience debuted at number one selling 106,000 copies in its first week and was the fastest selling album of 2013, at the time of its release. In its second chart week, the album sold another 56,000 copies in the UK. Its third week sales in the UK were 26,000. In Australia, The 20/20 Experience debuted at number one on the ARIA Charts and was accredited gold certification by the Australian Recording Industry Association for shipments of 35,000 copies. The 20/20 Experience additionally was certified gold in Germany for certified sales of 100,000 copies. At the time of its release, The 20/20 Experience was the fastest-selling album in iTunes history for a record's opening week, selling over 580,000 digital copies on iTunes worldwide.

In 2013, The 20/20 Experience was ranked as the number one album of the year on the Billboard 200. The following year, The 20/20 Experience remained on the Billboard 200-year end charts and was ranked as the one hundred forty-second most popular album of 2014.

The 20/20 Experience was also ranked as the 200th best album of all time on the Billboard Top 200 Albums of All Time.

Track listing 

Sample credits
 "Suit & Tie" contains a portion of the composition "Sho' Nuff", written by Stubbs, Wilson and Still.
 "That Girl" contains a sample of "Self Destruct", written by Williams, as performed by King Sporty.
 "Let the Groove Get In" contains a sample from the recording "Alhamdulillahi", from the album Explorer Series: Africa-Burkina Faso – Rhythms of the Grasslands.

Personnel
Credits are adapted from album's liner notes.

Justin Timberlake – executive producer, vocals , producer , vocal production and arrangements , mixing , guitar , keyboards 
Alejandro Baima – assistant mixing 
Steve Bone – assistant mixing 
Marc Cargill – violin solo 
Jimmy Douglass – mixing 
Reggie Dozier – strings and horns engineer 
Paul Foley – engineer 
Chris Godbey – engineer , mixing 
Jerome "J-Roc" Harmon – producer , keyboards 
Elliott Ives – guitars 
Jay-Z – rap 
Rob Knox – producer 
The Regiment – horns 
The Tennessee Kids – vocal production and arrangements 
Terry Santiel – percussion 
Timbaland – producer , additional vocals 
Matt Weber – assistant mixing 
Benjamin Wright and his Orchestra – strings , horns 
Dave Kutch – mastering
Tom Munro – photography
Doug Lloyd – creative direction
Jason Evans – creative direction
Michael Nash – stylist
Tom Ford – wardrobe

Charts

Weekly charts

Year-end charts

Decade-end charts

All-time chart

Certifications

Release history

See also
List of UK Albums Chart number ones of the 2010s
List of Billboard 200 number-one albums of 2013

References

External links
 

2013 albums
Albums produced by Jerome "J-Roc" Harmon
Albums produced by Justin Timberlake
Albums produced by Timbaland
Justin Timberlake albums
RCA Records albums
Albums recorded at EastWest Studios
Neo soul albums